Shibpur Hindu Girls High School is a secondary girls school located in Shibpur in Howrah, West Bengal, India. The school is affiliated with the West Bengal Board of Secondary Education and the West Bengal Council of Higher Secondary Education.

History

Foundation and funding 
Shibpur Hindu Girls High School was founded by Jadunath Banerjee in 1867, located in a rented house in the Shibpur area. The house was destroyed by an earthquake in 1869. The general public helped with the rebuilding of the school.

Initially, the students studied free of cost. Some local philanthropists donated 4 annas to run the school. After a few years, the school began charging minimum fees: 1 anna for primary students and 4 annas for secondary students. The Howrah Corporation donated Rs 7 every month until the year 1898. Up until 1925, the largest amount donated was Rs 40. 

In 1876, the school moved to a 4-bedroom renal home on Kshetra Mohan Banerjee Lane. Sister Nivedita, visited Sibpur Hindu Girls’ High School in 1902. She presided over an annual program hosted by the school and she gave away prizes to students. In 1910, a school inspector was dissatisfied with the school's location. It was moved to Ananda Kr Roy Chowdhury Lane, where the rent was Rs 1 per month. 

After the visit from another school inspector, government assistance of Rs 60 was to be given to the school. But for unknown reasons, the grant was never given. In 1913, a grant of Rs 20 per month was arranged, which later became Rs 50 per month. 

As the school's enrollment increased, the school began to run out of space. In 1914, at Sibpur Road, land was acquired for an expansion of the school. The school's committee asked for Rs 3000 from the state government. However, the government was unable to provide funding due to the First World War, For 11 years, the school functioned from its rented quarters.

In 1930, more land was added to the previously purchased plot of land. In 1932, the construction of the school started. 

In 1952, the West Bengal Board of Secondary Education granted Rs 46,247 to construct the building. An additional Rs 23,851 was given. In 1954, an additional plot of land was purchased for Rs 11,580. The West Bengal Board provided an additional Rs 5788 for construction costs. 

In 1959, the West Bengal Government took charge of running the school, providing Rs 50,000 in financial support.

Class size and teachers 
In the beginning, Shibpur Hindu Girls High School had 6 classes and 2 teachers. In 1902, the classes were increased to 7. In 1910 and 1914, two new teachers joined the school. The number of students rose from 168 to 200 in 1913. In 1946, Lila De became the school's principal. She had many lasting contributions to the school.  By 1952, the school introduced the English language into the curriculum. In the same year, the school reached an all-time high, when there were a total of 500 students enrolled in the school. In 1964, the school received permission to open its science department. In 1968, the commerce department was opened at the school.

As it stands today, the number of enrolled students is around 2500. The success rate in exams in 1964 was 75% and in 1965 it was 80%.

Campus 
The school's main building has three floors. The school has no large playground.

High School Subjects 
Subjects after the Madhyamik examination include:
Accountancy
Business economics
Bio-science
Bengali
Chemistry
Computer application
Computer science
Eco-statistics
Eco-geography
Education
English (B)
History
Mathematics
Philosophy
Physics
Political science

See also
Education in India
List of schools in India
Education in West Bengal

References

External links

1867 establishments in India
Education in Howrah
Girls' schools in West Bengal
High schools and secondary schools in West Bengal
Schools in Howrah district